Andrea Morricone (born 10 October 1964) is an Italian composer and conductor, known for his film scores. He is the third child, and second son, of  late composer and Academy Award winner Ennio Morricone. 
He composed the film scores for the American films Capturing the Friedmans and Liberty Heights. He collaborated with his father on the score for Cinema Paradiso, for which they won a BAFTA Award for For Best Original Film Music. The Love Theme from Cinema Paradiso is a work by Andrea Morricone. He has also composed music for many other Italian films, including The Inquiry and The Entrepreneur.

References

External links 
 
 

1964 births
Living people
Ennio Morricone
Best Original Music BAFTA Award winners
People of Sicilian descent